John I of Alexandria may refer to:

 John Talaia, ruled in 481–482
 Pope John I of Alexandria (Patriarch John II of Alexandria), ruled in 496–505